The Experience is a 2001 live album by gospel singer Yolanda Adams. The album also includes a two covers of R. Kelly's "I Believe I Can Fly": one studio version featuring R&B vocalist Gerald Levert, and a live solo version. Both were released as singles. The album was nominated for and won a Grammy for Best Contemporary Soul Gospel Album the following year (the second win for Adams).

Track listing 
 I Believe I Can Fly (featuring Gerald Levert) 5:59
 Already Alright 5:03
 Continual Praise 4:29
 Fragile Heart 7:25
 What About The Children? 6:15
 Ye Of Little Faith 4:56
 Open My Heart 7:46
 That Name 5:05
 In The Midst Of It All 5:39
 Yeah 5:57
 I Believe I Can Fly 6:12

Chart positions

References

External links
 

Yolanda Adams albums
2001 live albums
Elektra Records live albums